Peters is a patronymic surname (Peter's son) of Low German, Dutch, and English  origin. It can also be an English translation of Gaelic Mac Pheadair (same meaning) or an Americanized form of cognate surnames like Peeters or Pieters.

Geographical distribution
As of 2014, 34.4% of all known bearers of the surname Peters were residents of the United States (frequency 1:2,037), 23.6% of Germany (1:658), 6.4% of the Netherlands (1:511), 5.4% of Canada (1:1,328), 5.2% of Nigeria (1:6,574), 4.8% of England (1:2,261), 3.9% of South Africa (1:2,708), 3.1% of Australia (1:1,482), 1.2% of Togo (1:1,226), 1.1% of Sierra Leone (1:1,214) and 1.0% of Belgium (1:2,220).

In Germany, the frequency of the surname was higher than national average (1:658) in the following states:
 1. Schleswig-Holstein (1:209)
 2. Mecklenburg-Vorpommern (1:220)
 3. Hamburg (1:293)
 4. Lower Saxony (1:364)
 5. North Rhine-Westphalia (1:402)
 6. Bremen (1:471)

In the Netherlands, the frequency of the surname was higher than national average (1:511) in the following provinces:
 1. Gelderland (1:198)
 2. Limburg (1:215)
 3. Bonaire (1:322)
 4. North Brabant (1:433)

People

Academics
Achim Peters (born 1957), German obesity specialist
Anne Peters (born 1964),  German-Swiss legal scholar 
Arno Peters (1916–2002), German filmmaker & historian. Peters map projection. 
Bernard Peters (1910–1993), German nuclear physicist
Brett Peters, American industrial engineer and college dean
C. J. Peters (Clarence James Peters; born 1940), American virologists and tropical physician
Christian August Friedrich Peters (1806–1880), German astronomer
Christian Heinrich Friedrich Peters (1813–1890), German-born American astronomer
David Peters (professor), American physician and healthcare academic
Dennis G. Peters (born 1937), American analytical chemist
E. L. Peters (1916–1987), British social anthropologist
 (1869–1948), German prehistorian
Edward Peters (scholar) (born 1936), American historian of medieval Europe
Francis Edward Peters (born 1927), American scholar on Middle Eastern religions 
Frank Peters (college president) (1920–1987), Canadian university president
George Henry Peters (1863–1947), American astronomer
James A. Peters (1922–1972), American herpetologist
James L. Peters (1889–1952), American ornithologist
Jan Peters (computer scientist) (born 1976), German computer scientist
Jan Peters (engineer), British engineer
Jan-Michael Peters (born 1962), German cell and molecular biologist
John Durham Peters (born 1958), communications professor
John F. Peters (1884–1969), American electrical engineer and inventor
Keith Peters (physician) (born 1938), Welsh physician and academic
Klaus Peters (1937–2014), German mathematician and publisher
Kurt Peters (1897–1978), Austrian chemist
Mary Peters Fieser (1909–1997), née Mary Peters, American chemist
Michael Peters (psychologist) (born 1942), Canadian psychologist
Michael Adrian Peters (born 1948), New Zealand education academic
Norbert Peters (engineer) (1942–2015), Austrian-German chemical engineer
Norbert Peters (priest) (1863–1938), German Catholic biblical scholar
Otto Peters (born 1926), German education academic
Pam Peters (born 1942), Australian linguist
Paul Peters (publisher) (born 1982), American academic publisher
Paul Evan Peters (1947–1996), American librarian
Peter J. Peters (born 1957), Dutch cellular immunologist
Raymond Peters (1918–1995), British polymer chemist
Reinhard Peters (1926–2008), German operatic conductor, violinist and academic teacher
Richard Stanley Peters (1919–2011), British philosopher
Robert Henry Peters (1946–1996), Canadian ecologist and limnologist
Rudolph Peters (1889–1982), British biochemist
Rudolph F. Peters (born 1943), Dutch scholar of Islam
Steve Peters (psychiatrist) (born 1953), English sports psychiatrist
Stormy Peters, American information technologist
Thomas Minott Peters (1810–1888), American lawyer, Alabama Chief Justice, and botanist
Tim Peters (software engineer), American software developer
Vera Peters (1911–1993), Canadian oncologist and clinical investigator
Wallace Peters (1924–2018), British entomologist and parasitologist
Wilhelm Peters (1815–1883), German explorer and naturalist
William John Peters (1863–1942), American explorer and geologist

Arts

Musical
Ben Peters (1933–2005), American country music songwriter
Bernadette Peters (born 1948), American actress and singer
Brian Peters, English folk singer and multi-instrumentalist
Caleigh Peters (born 1988), American musician, daughter of Jon Peters
Carl Friedrich Peters (1779–1827), German music publisher
Ciska Peters (born 1945), Dutch pop singer
Clarence Peters (born 1980s), Nigerian music video director, filmmaker and cinematographer
Claudette Peters (born 1979), Antiguan soca singer-songwriter
Crispian St. Peters (1939–2010), English pop singer-songwriter
Cyndee Peters (born 1946), American-Swedish gospel singer and author 
Dan Peters (born 1967), American rock drummer
Dave Peters, American heavy metal musician
Duane Peters (born 1961), skateboarder and punk singer/songwriter
Edith Peters (1926–2000), American singer and film actress
Eric Peters (musician) (born 1972), American musician
Finn Peters, British flautist and saxophonist
Gretchen Peters (born 1957), American country singer
Grice Peters, English art rock musician
Ingrid Peters (born 1954), German singer
Ivana Peters (born 1974), Serbian pop rock musician
JJ Peters (born 1982), Australian rock musician
Jane Peters (born 1963), Australian classical violinist 
Jerry Peters (born 1940s), American funk and soul musician
Johanna Peters (1932–2000), Scottish mezzo-soprano
Jonathan Peters (born 1969), American DJ and record producer
Lennie Peters (1931–1992), British singer from Peters and Lee
Linda Peters (born 1947), English folk rock singer a.k.a. Linda Thompson
Mark Peters (musician) (born 1975), English musician, songwriter and producer
Mary Peters (hymn writer) (1813–1856), British hymn writer
Mike Peters (drummer), Canadian punk drummer
Mike Peters (musician) (born 1959), Welsh singer and songwriter of "The Alarm"
Mitchell Peters (1935–2017), American percussionist and composer
Moriah Peters (born 1992), American Christian singer and songwriter
Norbert Walter Peters (born 1954), German composer
Randolph Peters (born 1959), Canadian composer
Red Peters (born 1950), American musician and comedian, pseudonym of Douglas Stevens
Roberta Peters (1930–2017), American coloratura soprano
Ryan Peters (musician), Canadian singer-songwriter
Ryan Michael Peters (born 1985), American rapper known as "Spose"
Scott Peters (musician), Canadian folk rock musician
Shina Peters (born 1958), Nigerian musician
Suresh Peters (born 1968), Indian music director and playback rapper/singer 
Vanessa Peters (born 1980), American folk rock singer-songwriter
Wilfred Peters (1931–2010), Belizean accordionist and band leader
The Peters Sisters – Mattie (1917–1983), Anne (1920–1965), and Virginia (1923–2010) – American vocal trio

Theatrical
Anton Peters (1923–1989), Belgian actor and film director
Arnold Peters (1925–2013), British actor
Audrey Peters (born 1927), American soap opera actress
Bernadette Peters (born 1948), American actress and singer
Brock Peters (1927–2005), American actor
Caroline Peters (born 1971), German actress
Cece Peters, Australian television actress
Christel Peters (1916–2009), German stage and television actress
Clarke Peters (born 1952), pseudonym of American actor Peter Clarke
Dennis Alaba Peters (c. 1935 – 1996), Gambian actor
Edith Peters (1926–2000), American singer and film actress
Emma Peters (born 1978), Swedish actress
Evan Peters (born 1987), American film actor
Frederick Peters (actor) (1884–1963), American film actor
Gordon Peters (1926–2022), British television actor
House Peters Jr. (1916–2008), American character actor
House Peters Sr. (1880–1967), British-born American silent film actor
Ina Peters (1928–2004), Austrian stage and film actress
Jane Alice Peters (1908–1942), American film actress with the stage name Carole Lombard
Jean Peters (1926–2000), American actress
Jon Peters (born 1945), American film producer
Karl-Heinz Peters (1903–1990), German film actor
Lauri Peters (born 1943), American actress
Luan Peters (1946–2017), English actress and singer
Lyn Peters (c. 1941 – 2013), Argentine-born British-American model, actress and caterer
 (born 1958), Dutch film director, producer and screenwriter
Michael Peters (choreographer) (1948–1994), American choreographer
Molly Peters (1942–2017), British actress
Pauline Peters (1896–?), Welsh film actress
Petra Peters (1925–2004), German stage and film actress
Rick Peters (born 1967), American actor
Robert O. Peters (born 1973), Nigerian film producer and director
Russell Peters (born 1970), Canadian comedian
Sabine Peters (1912–1982), German film actress
Susan Peters (1921–1952), American actress
Susan Peters (Nigerian actress) (born 1980), Nigerian film actress
Vicki Peters (born 1950), American model and actress
Wendi Peters (born 1968), English stage and television actress
Werner Peters (1918–1971), German film actor
William Theodore Peters (1862–1904), American poet and actor
Willy Peters (1915–1976), Swedish film actor and director

Visual
Alan Peters (1933–2009), British furniture maker
Anna Peters (1843–1926), German flower and landscape painter, daughter of Pieter Francis Peters
Christa Peters (1933–1981), German fashion photographer
Clarissa Peters Russell (1809–1854), American miniaturist
Curtis Arnoux Peters, Jr. (1904–1968), American cartoonist known as "Curtis Arno"
Eric Peters (painter) (born 1952), German painter
Eugène Peters (born 1946), Dutch painter, graphic artist and sculptor
Frazier Forman Peters (1895–1963), American builder and architect
Fred Peters (artist) (1923–2018), American animator and comics artist
Giovanni Peters (1624–1677), Italianate name of Flemish painter Jan Peeters
Greg Peters (1962–2013), American editorial cartoonist
Hans Peters (1894–1976), English art director
Ivo Peters (1915–1989), English photographer of steam railways
Joe Peters (born 1983), American glass artist
Johann Anton de Peters (1725–1795), German painter and etcher
Lilo Peters (1913–2001), North German painter and sculptor
Michael Peters (designer) (born 1930s), British graphic designer
Mike Peters (cartoonist) (born 1943), American cartoonist
Nelle Peters (1884–1974), American architect
Pieter Francis Peters (1818–1903), Dutch-born German landscape painter and art dealer
Pietronella Peters (1848–1924), German portrait and genre painter, daughter of Pieter F. Peters
Robert L. Peters (born 1954), Canadian graphics designer and industrial designer
Sara Peters Grozelier (1821–1907), American miniaturist
Shani Peters, American artist
Wilhelm Peters (1851–1935), Norwegian painter
William Peters (painter) (1742–1814), British painter
William Wesley Peters (1912–1991), American architect

Business
Benedict Peters (born 1966), Nigerian billionaire
Bob Peters (born 1942), Australian businessman and horse breeder 
Edward C. Peters (1855–1937), American real estate developer in Atlanta, son of Richard Peters (Atlanta)
George Peters (banker), Governor of the Bank of England, 1785–1787
Hans-Walter Peters (born 1955), German banker
Henry Peters (c. 1763 – 1827), British banker and Member of Parliament
Leone J. Peters (1911–1988), American businessman and racehorse breeder
Lovett Peters (1913–2010), American oil and gas entrepreneur known for the Peters Foundation
Ralph Peters (LIRR) (1853–1923), American railroad executive
Richard Peters (Atlanta) (1810–1889), American railroad man, cofounder of Atlanta City
Richard Peters (clubman) (1848–1921), American civil engineer and railroad executive, son of the above
Russ Peters (born 1940s), British ferry businessman
Tom Peters (born 1942), American business consultant and writer

Law
Aulana L. Peters (born c. 1950), American lawyer
Charles Jeffery Peters (1773–1848), New Brunswick lawyer, judge and politician
Curtis Arnoux Peters (1879–1933), American New York Supreme Court Justice
Edward N. Peters (born 1957), American canon lawyer
Ellen Ash Peters (born 1930), German-born American lawyer and judge
Elliot R. Peters (born 1958), American trial attorney
F. Whitten Peters (born 1946), American lawyer, U.S. Secretary of the Air Force 1997–2001
Frederick Peters (1851–1919), Canadian lawyer, Premier of Prince Edward Island 1891–97
John A. Peters (1822–1904), American judge and US representative from Maine
John A. Peters (1864–1953), American judge and US representative from Maine
John M. Peters (1927–2013), American lawyer and legislator
Karen K. Peters (born 1947), American jurist
Karl Peters (jurist) (1904–1998), German expert in criminal law
Marybeth Peters (born 1939), American jurist and copyrights expert
Nigel Peters (born 1952), English judge
Raymond E. Peters (1903–1973), American Supreme Court of California justice
Richard Peters, Jr. (1744–1828), Pennsylvania jurist and Continental Congressman
Richard Peters (reporter) (1780–1848), American jurist and Supreme Court official, son of the above
Thomas Minott Peters (1810–1888), American lawyer, Alabama Chief Justice, and botanist
William Peters (lawyer) (1702–1786), American lawyer and judge from Philadelphia

Military and police
Alexander Peters (1869–1951), United States Navy sailor
Arthur Peters (Royal Navy officer) (1888–1979), British Naval Secretary 1941–42
Frederick Thornton Peters (1889–1942), Canadian Captain in the Royal Navy
George Peters (aviator) (1894–1959), Australian flying ace in World War I
George J. Peters (1924–1945), American Medal of Honor recipient
J. Greg Peters (born 1960), Canadian Mounted Police Superintendent
John Peters (RAF officer) (born 1961), English pilot of the Royal Air Force
Kurd Peters (1914–1957), German World War II pilot
Lawrence D. Peters (1946–1967), United States Marine sergeant
Ralph Peters (born 1952), American U.S. Army officer and military writer
Robert Peters (RAF officer) (born 1940), British Royal Air Force officer
Yakov Peters (Jēkabs Peterss; 1886–1936), Latvian Communist revolutionary and leader of the Soviet secret police

Politics
Andrew James Peters (1872–1938), Mayor of Boston
Ann Peters, former Health Minister of Grenada
Annie Peters (1920–2007), South African anti-apartheid activist
Arnold Peters (1922–1996), Canadian politician
Arthur Peters (1854–1908), Canadian politician, Premier of Prince Edward Island
Arthur Peters (British politician) (1867–1956), British Liberal Party politician
Augustus W. Peters (1844–1898), Canadian-born New York City politician
Bobby Peters (born 1949), American mayor and judge
Carl Peters (1856–1918), German colonial ruler, explorer, politician and author
David Peters (politician) (born 1954), American (Massachusetts) politician
Deb Peters (born 1974), American (South Dakota) politician
Dipuo Peters (born 1960), South African Premier of the Northern Cape, Minister of Energy and Minister of Transport
Douglas Peters (1930–2016), Canadian banker and politician
Douglas J. J. Peters (born 1963), American (Maryland) politician
Ellen Dolly Peters (1894–1995), Montserratian teacher and trade unionist
F. Whitten Peters (born 1946), American lawyer, U.S. Secretary of the Air Force 1997–2001
Fred Peters (politician) (1867–1935), Dutch-born American (Utah) politician
Frederick Peters (1851–1919), Canadian lawyer, Premier of Prince Edward Island 1891–97
Gary Peters (born 1958), American (Michigan) politician and businessman
George Silas Peters (1846–1928), American mayor of Columbus, Ohio, 1881–1882
Harry Peters (1788–1870), New Brunswick merchant and politician
Henry Peters (Australian politician) (1881–1918), New South Wales politician
Henry M. Peters (1889–1987), American (Wisconsin) politician
Ian Peters (born 1941), New Zealand politician
Jan Peters (communist) (1886–1938), one name of Latvian Communist revolutionary Jēkabs Peterss
Jeremy W. Peters (born c. 1980), American journalist and politics reporter
Jesse Peters (1897–1962), American (Wisconsin) politician
Jim Peters (politician) (born 1937), New Zealand politician
John A. Peters (1822–1904), American judge and US representative from Maine
John A. Peters (1864–1953), American judge and US representative from Maine
John E. Peters (1839–1919), businessman and politician in Newfoundland
John M. Peters (1927–2013), American lawyer and legislator
John Samuel Peters (1772–1858), American politician and governor of Connecticut
Joshua Peters (born 1987), American (Missouri) politician
Kathleen Peters (born 1961), American (Florida) politician
 (1900–1984), Dutch minister of Kingdom Relations 1951–52
Louanner Peters (born c. 1950), American (Illinois) politician
Maria Liberia Peters (born 1941), Prime Minister of the Netherlands Antilles 1984–86
Mariko Peters (born 1969), Dutch politician
Mary Ann Peters (born 1951), American diplomat; CEO of the Carter Center
Mary E. Peters (born 1948), American politician; US Secretary of Transportation 2006–09
Mason S. Peters (1844–1914), American politician, U.S. Representative from Kansas
Nellie Peters Black (née Nellie Peters; 1851–1919), American women's rights activist
Paul Peters (born 1942), Dutch politician
Rebecca Peters, Australian gun control activist
Richard Peters, Jr. (1744–1828), Pennsylvania jurist and Continental Congressman
Robert Peters (politician) (born 1985/86), American politician in Illinois
Rudi Peters (1939–2002), Canadian (Saskatchewan) politician
Ryan Peters (politician) (born c. 1982), American politician in New Jersey
Samuel R. Peters (1842–1910), American politician, U.S. congressman from Kansas
Scott Peters (politician) (born 1958), American politician, U.S. congressman from San Diego
Sidney Peters (1885–1976), English Liberal Party politician
Steve Peters (Manitoba politician) (1912–1976), Canadian (Manitoba) politician
Steve Peters (Ontario politician) (born 1963), Canadian (Ontario) politician
Susan Peters (politician), Californian (Sacramento) politician
Ted Peters (politician) (1897–1980), Australian Labor Party politician
Thomas Peters (revolutionary) (1738–1792), Nigerian-born African-American founding father of Sierra Leone
William Peters (Australian politician) (1903–1978), Australian (New South Wales) politician
William Peters (diplomat) (1923–2014), British diplomat and founder of Jubilee 2000
William H. Peters (1825–?), Wisconsin legislator
William Thompson Peters (1805–1885), American politician
Winston Peters (born 1945), New Zealand politician and leader of New Zealand First
Winston "Gypsy" Peters (born 1952), Trinidad and Tobago calypsonian and politician
Yakov Peters (Jēkabs Peterss; 1886–1936), Latvian Communist revolutionary and leader of the Soviet secret police

Radio and television
Andi Peters (born 1970), British television presenter
Butz Peters (born 1958), German television presenter
John Peters (DJ) (born 1940s), British radio presenter
Susan Peters (TV anchor) (born 1956), American news anchor
Sylvia Peters (1925–2016), English television continuity announcer and presenter

Religion
Arthur Peters (bishop) (born 1935), Canadian Anglican bishop
Christopher Peters (born 1950s), Anglican Church leader in Ireland
George N. H. Peters (1825–1909), American Lutheran minister
Hugh Peters (1598–1660), English Puritan minister and propagandist for Oliver Cromwell
Humphrey Peters, Pakistani Anglican bishop
John Punnett Peters (1852–1921), American Episcopal clergyman
 (born 1960), German Catholic auxiliary bishop
Karl E. Peters (born 1939), American theologist and religious naturalist
Madison Clinton Peters (1859–1918), American clergyman
Richard Peters (priest) (1704–1776), English-born Pennsylvania colonial Anglican clergyman
Samuel Peters (1735–1826), Connecticut Anglican clergyman
Ted Peters (theologian) (born 1941), American Lutheran theologian

Sports
Akeira Peters (born 1993), Grenadian cricketer
Alec Peters (born 1995), American basketball player
Alex Peters (born 1994), English road cyclist
Alexander Peters (footballer) (born 1991), Belizean footballer
Anderson Peters (born 1997), Grenadian javelin thrower
Andrew Peters (born 1980) Canadian ice hockey player
Ann-Louise Peters (born 1975), Danish darts player
Annette Peters (born 1965), American long-distance runner
Anthony Peters (born 1983), American soccer player
Anthony Peters (born 1996), American racewalker
Artuur Peters (born 1996), Belgian canoeist
Ayodele Peters (born 1957), Nigerian boxer
Bart Peters (born 1965), Dutch rower
Bas Peters (born 1976), Dutch mountain biker
Beate Peters (born 1959), West German javelin thrower
Bert Peters (1908–1944), Australian rules footballer
Bill Peters (footballer) (1898–1957), Australian footballer
Bill Peters (ice hockey) (born 1965), Canadian ice hockey player and coach
Bob Peters (born 1937), Canadian ice hockey coach
Brandon Peters (born 1997), American football quarterback
Brian Peters (gridiron football) (born 1988), American football linebacker
Carl-Ludwig Peters (born 1921), German field hockey player
Carol Ann Peters (born 1932), American ice dancer
Cas Peters (born 1993), Dutch football winger
Chris Peters (born 1972), American baseball pitcher
Clara Peters (born 1991), Irish figure skater
Connor Peters (born 1996), English-Antiguan footballer
Corey Peters (born 1988), American football defensive tackle 
Corey Peters (alpine skier) (born 1983), New Zealand alpine skier
Corinne Peters (born 1960), Canadian curler
Daley Peters (born 1984), Canadian curler 
Dan Peters (basketball) (1954–2014), American basketball coach
Darren Peters, Australian Paralympic Committee official
Dean Peters (1958–1998), American wrestler known as "Brady Boone" or "Battle Kat"
Devereaux Peters (born 1989), American basketball player
Dietmar Peters (born 1949), German ice hockey player
Dillon Peters (born 1992), American baseball pitcher
Dimitri Peters (born 1984), Russian-born German judoka
Dominic Peters (born 1978), English rugby player
Don Peters (born 1949), American gymnastics coach
Dwight Peters (born 1986), Guyanese football midfielder
Elisabeth Peters (born 1987), Canadian curler
Emmitt Peters (born 1940), American dog sled racer
Eric Peters (rugby union) (born 1969), Scottish rugby player
Erich Peters (1920–2012), Swedish gymnast
F. H. Peters (1879–1970), American college football coach
Floyd Peters (1936–2008), American football defensive tackle
Frank Peters (footballer) (1910–?), English footballer
Frank Peters (ice hockey) (1902–1973), American ice hockey player
Frosty Peters (1904–1980), American football player
Gail Peters (born 1929), American swimmer
Garry Peters (born 1942), Canadian ice hockey player and coach
Garry Peters (footballer) (born 1945), Australian rules footballer
Garry Peters (gridiron football) (born 1991), American player of Canadian football
Gary Peters (baseball player) (born 1937), American baseball player
Gary Peters (footballer) (born 1954), English footballer and manager
Geoff Peters, British sports commentator and broadcaster
George Peters (footballer) (1912–1988), Australian footballer
Gerard Peters (1920–2005), Dutch track and road cyclist 
Hank Peters (1924–2015), American baseball executive
Hanns Peters (1930–2015), German rower
Heinrich Peters (fl. 1900), German Olympic sailor
Herman Peters (1899–1989), Australian rugby player
Hilda Peters (born 1983), New Zealand rugby player
Jack Peters (fl. 1890s), English footballer
Jacob Peters (swimmer) (born 2000), British swimmer
Jaime Peters (born 1987), Canadian soccer player
Jaison Peters (born 1989), Montserratian cricketer
Jamal Peters (born 1996), American football player
James Peters (rugby player) (1879–1954), English rugby player
Jan Peters (football) (born 1954), Dutch international football midfielder
  (born 1953), Dutch football forward
Jason Peters (born 1982), American football player
Jelani Peters (born 1993), Trinidadian footballer
Jim Peters (athlete) (1918–1999), English long-distance runner
Jimmy Peters, Jr. (born 1944), Canadian ice hockey player
Jimmy Peters, Sr. (1922–2006), Canadian ice hockey player 
Joanne Peters (born 1979), Australian soccer player
John Peters (catcher) (1893–1932), American baseball player
John Peters (shortstop) (1850–1924), American baseball player
Jon Peters (pitcher) (born c. 1970), American baseball pitcher
Jordens Peters (born 1987), Dutch football defender
Josef Peters (racing driver) (1914–2001), German Formula One driver
Josh Peters (born 1995), Spanish rugby player
Justin Peters (born 1986), Canadian ice hockey goaltender
Kari Peters (born 1985), Luxembourgish cross-country skier
Kasey Peters (born 1987), American football player
Keith Peters (footballer) (1915–1989), English football defender
Keith Peters (rugby league) (born 1986), Papua New Guinean rugby player
Ken Peters (1915–2013), American baseball player and school superintendent
Kenroy Peters (born 1982), St Vincent cricketer 
Kerstin Peters (born 1967), German rower
Laine Peters (born 1970), Canadian curler
Laurie Peters (1916–2011), Australian rules footballer
Leonard Peters (born 1981), Samoan American football safety and rugby player
Lexi Peters (born 1997), American ice hockey player
Liam Peters (born 1997), South African cricketer
Lisa Peters (born c. 1980), Welsh curler
Luisa Peters (born 1993), Cook Islands weightlifter
Lyle Peters (born 1991), South African footballer
Marcus Peters (born 1993), American football cornerback
Marjorie Peters (1918–2016), American baseball player
Mark Peters (footballer, born 1972), Welsh football defender
Mark Peters (footballer, born 1983), English football forward
Mark Peters (sport administrator), Australian baseball player and sports executive
Marnie Peters, Canadian wheelchair basketball player
Martin Peters (1943–2019), English footballer
Marty Peters (born c. 1913), American football player and coach
Mary Peters (athlete) (born 1939), British athlete
Maureen Peters (cricketer) (born 1944), New Zealand cricketer
Maurice Peters (1917–1987), American jockey
Maxwell Peters (born 1955), Antigua and Barbuda athlete
Mickey Peters (born 1980), American football wide receiver
Mitchell Peters (athlete) (born 1970), Virgin Islander sprinter
Nans Peters (born 1994), French road cyclist
Nicholas Peters (born 1968), English cricketer
Nyanforth Peters (born 1975), Liberian footballer
Orlando Peters (born 1988), Antiguan cricketer
Otha Peters (born 1994), American football linebacker
Patrick Peters (born 1987), German football defender
Paw Peters (born 1976), Danish handballer
Peter Peters (born 1947), Australian rugby player
Peter Peters (football official) (born 1962), German journalist and football official
Piet Peters (born 1921), Dutch road cyclist
Ray Peters (born 1946), American baseball player
René Peters (born 1981), Luxembourgish footballer
Richard Peters (cricketer) (1911–1989), English cricketer
Richard Peters (football coach) (1920–1973), American college football coach
Ricky Peters (born 1955), American baseball player
Robbie Peters (born 1971), English footballer
Robert Peters (cyclist) (born 1970), Antiguan cyclist
Rodrigo Peters Marques (born 1985), Brazilian football goalkeeper nicknamed "Café"
Roger Peters (born 1944), English football winger
Rotimi Peters (born 1955), Nigerian sprinter
Rube Peters (1885–1965), American baseball pitcher
Rusty Peters (1914–2003), American baseball player
Ryan Peters (footballer) (born 1987), English footballer
Scott Peters (American football) (born 1978), American football offensive lineman
Seaver Peters (born 1932), American ice hockey player
Shanaka Peters (born 1991), Sri Lankan weightlifter
Shannon Peters (born 1969), Australian tennis player
Sherwin Peters (born 1990), Leeward Islands cricketer
Sonja Peters (born 1976), Dutch wheelchair tennis player
Steffen Peters (born 1964), German-born American equestrian
Stephen Peters (born 1978), English cricketer
Steve Peters (baseball) (born 1962), American baseball pitcher
Steve Peters (ice hockey) (born 1960), Canadian ice hockey forward
Thoralf Peters (born 1968), German rower
Timothy Peters (born 1980), American racing driver
Tina Peters (born 1968), German field hockey player
Tony Peters (born 1953), American football safety
Trevor Peters (born 1990), British Virgin Islands footballer
Ulrich Peters (born 1951), West German slalom canoeist
Ulrich Peters (basketball) (born 1957), German basketball player
Vic Peters (1955–2016), Canadian curler
Violet Peters (born c. 1930), Indian sprinter
Violetta Peters (born 1977), German-born, Austrian slalom canoeist
Vivian Peters (born 1975), Nigerian shot putter
Volney Peters (1928–2015), American football defensive tackle
W. S. Peters (1867–1933), African-American baseball player, manager, and owner
Warren Peters (born 1982), Canadian hockey player
Wayne Peters (born 1969), Australian rules footballer
Willem Peters (1903–1995), Dutch triple jump athlete
William Peters (sport shooter) (fl. 1956), Colombian Olympic shooter
Willie Peters (born 1979), Australian rugby player
Wolfgang Peters (1929–2003), German football winger
Wolfgang Peters (canoeist) (born 1948), West German slalom canoeist
Nick Peters (1939–2015), American baseball writer

Writers
A. D. Peters (1892–1973), British literary agent
Carl Peters (1856–1918), German colonial ruler, explorer, politician and author
Cash Peters (born 1956), British travel writer
Charles Peters (born 1926), American journalist, editor, and author
Christoph Peters (born 1966), German novelist
Edgar E. Peters (born 1952), asset manager and writer
Elizabeth Peters (1927–2013), pseudonym of American author Barbara Mertz
Ellis Peters (1913–1995), pseudonym of English author Edith Pargeter
Eugenia Peters (1730–1783), English letter writer and publisher
Frank Peters Jr. (1930–2007), American journalist
Gretchen Peters (journalist), American journalist and organized crime expert
Joan Peters (1938–2015), American journalist
John Peters (chess player) (born 1951), American chess player and newspaper columnist
Julie Anne Peters (born 1942), American children's writer
Lenrie Peters (1932–2009), Gambian surgeon, novelist, poet and educationist
Louise Otto-Peters (1819–1895), German suffragist and writer
Lulu Hunt Peters (1873–1930), American physician, dietitian and author
Margot Peters (born 1933), American novelist and biographer
Maureen Peters (novelist) (1935–2008), Welsh historical novelist
Nancy Peters (born 1936), American author and publisher
Nonja Peters (born c. 1945), Dutch-born Australian author
Paula Peters (born c. 1966), Native American journalist
Petresia Peters (1834–1924), American author and editor; pen name of Julia Carter Aldrich
Phillis Wheatley Peters (c. 1753 – 1784), African-American poet
Robert Peters (1924–2014), American poet
Roy Peters, pseudonym of English western writer Arthur Nickson (1902–1974) 
Scott Peters (writer), Canadian television director and screenwriter
William Peters (journalist) (1921–2007), American journalist and documentary filmmaker

Other
Alice E. Heckler Peters (1845-1921), American social reformer
Amina Lahbabi-Peters, Moroccan interpreter and translator
Carl Peters (1856–1918), German colonial ruler, explorer, politician and author
David Peters (poker player) (born 1987), American poker player
Demi-Leigh Nel-Peters (born 1995), South African model, Miss South Africa 2017, and Miss Universe 2017
Erik Peters (born 1930s), Canadian civil servant
Frederick Emerson Peters (1885–1959), American fraudster
Hans Peters (fl. 2001), Dutch game show contestant
J. Peters (1894–1990), pseudonym of Hungarian-born Soviet spy master Sándor Goldberger
Karl Peters (1856–1918), German traveller in East Africa Carl Peters
Lana Peters (1926–2011), adopted name of Stalin's youngest child, who defected to the United States
Mary Peters (1852–1921), Native American (Umpqua) woman and ferry operator in Oregon
Paul Douglas Peters, person convicted after 2011 Australian bomb hoax
Rachel Peters (born 1991), Filipino-British model, beauty queen, and Miss Universe Philippines 2017
Rebecca Todd Peters (born 1967), American feminist and Christian social ethicist
Steve Peters (game designer) (born 1961), American game designer
Susie Peters (1873–1965), American preservationist and Indian Agency matron
Thomas Peters (supercentenarian) (1745?–1857), Dutchman, possibly first recorded person over 110 years old
Thomas Kimmwood Peters (1879–1973), American cinema pioneer, photographer, archivist
Tim A. Peters (born 1950s), American humanitarian aid worker

References

Dutch-language surnames
German-language surnames
English-language surnames
Anglicised Irish-language surnames
Americanized surnames
Patronymic surnames
Russian Mennonite surnames